The ANT catalog (or TAO catalog) is a classified product catalog by the U.S. National Security Agency (NSA) of which the version written in 2008–2009 was published by German news magazine Der Spiegel in December 2013. Forty-nine catalog pages with pictures, diagrams and descriptions of espionage devices and spying software were published. The items are available to the Tailored Access Operations unit and are mostly targeted at products from US companies such as Apple, Cisco and Dell. The source is believed to be someone different than Edward Snowden, who is largely responsible for the global surveillance disclosures since 2013. Companies whose products could be compromised have denied any collaboration with the NSA in developing these capabilities. In 2014, a project was started to implement the capabilities from the ANT catalog as open-source hardware and software.

Background 
The Tailored Access Operations unit has existed since the late 90s. Its mission is to collect intelligence on foreign targets of the United States by hacking into computers and telecommunication networks.

In 2012, Edward Snowden organized a CryptoParty together with Runa Sandvik, a former colleague of Jacob Appelbaum at The Tor Project. In June 2013, Snowden took internal NSA documents which he shared with Glenn Greenwald and Laura Poitras, resulting in the global surveillance disclosures. It has been speculated for years before that capabilities like those in the ANT catalog existed.

Publication 
On December 30, Appelbaum gave a lecture about "the militarization of the Internet" at the 30th Chaos Communication Congress in Hamburg, Germany. At the end of his talk, he encouraged NSA employees to leak more documents.

Apple denied the allegations that it collaborated on the development of DROPOUTJEEP in a statement to journalist Arik Hesseldahl from All Things Digital (part of the Wall Street Journal'''s Digital Network). The Verge questioned how the program developed in later years, since the document was composed in the early period of the iPhone and smartphones in general. Dell denied collaborating with any government in general, including the US government. John Stewart, senior vice president and chief security officer of Cisco stated that they were "deeply concerned and will continue to pursue all avenues to determine if we need to address any new issues." Juniper stated that they were working actively to address any possible exploit paths. Huawei stated they would take appropriate audits to determine if any compromise had taken place and would communicate if that had taken place. NSA declined to comment on the publication by Der Spiegel.

 Source 
The source who leaked the ANT catalog to the press is unknown as of 2023.

Author James Bamford, who is specialized in the United States intelligence agencies, noted in a commentary article published by Reuters'' that Appelbaum has not identified the source who leaked the ANT catalog to him, which led people to mistakenly assume it was Edward Snowden. Bamford got unrestricted access to the documents cache from Edward Snowden and could not find any references to the ANT catalog using automated search tools, thereby concluding that the documents were not leaked by him. Security expert Bruce Schneier has stated on his blog that he also believes the ANT catalog did not come from Snowden, but from a second leaker. Officials at the NSA did not believe that the web crawler used by Snowden touched the ANT catalog and started looking for other people who could have leaked the catalog.

Content 
The published catalog pages were written between 2008 and 2009. The price of the items ranged from free up to $250,000.

Follow-up developments 
Security expert Matt Suiche noted that the software exploits leaked by the Shadow Brokers could be seen as genuine because it matched with names from the ANT catalog. John Bumgarner has stated to IEEE Spectrum that US government suspicion of Huawei is based on its own ability to add backdoors as shown in the ANT catalog.

NSA Playset 
The NSA Playset is an open-source project inspired by the NSA ANT catalog to create more accessible and easy to use tools for security researchers. Most of the surveillance tools can be recreated with off-the-shelf or open-source hardware and software. Thus far, the NSA Playset consists of fourteen items, for which the code and instructions can be found online on the project's homepage. After the initial leak, Michael Ossman, the founder of Great Scott Gadgets, gave a shout out to other security researchers to start working on the tools mentioned in the catalog and to recreate them. The name NSA Playset came originally from Dean Pierce, who is also a contributor (TWILIGHTVEGETABLE(GSM)) to the NSA Playset. Anyone is invited to join and contribute their own device. The requisites for an addition to the NSA Playset is a similar or already existing NSA ANT project, ease of use and a silly name (based on the original tool's name if possible). The silly name requisite is a rule that Michael Ossman himself came up with and an example is given on the project's website: "For example, if your project is similar to FOXACID, maybe you could call it COYOTEMETH." The ease of use part stems also from the NSA Playset's motto: "If a 10 year old can't do it, it doesn't count!"

See also 
 Cyberwarfare in the United States
 Equation Group
 MiniPanzer and MegaPanzer
 Stuxnet
 WARRIOR PRIDE

Explanatory notes

References

Further reading

External links 

 NSA Playset wiki
 The NSA Playset a Year of toys and tools at Black Hat 2015
 NSA Playset at Toorcamp 2014

Der Spiegel
Espionage devices
National Security Agency
Spyware used by governments
Surveillance